Beat the Crusher is a British game show that aired on Sky One from 21 September to 23 November 1998. It was hosted by Melinda Messenger and assisted by Freddie Starr. The show was noted for its bizarre end game, which featured two couples gambling their cars for the chance to win a new one. The winning team received the new car, while the losing couple's car was dropped into a car crusher (or more specifically, a modified Lefort Mobile Baler)  and destroyed, with their bus fare home being given as a consolation prize.

Format
The show usually began with an audience member being called out and a large item of personal value being put in the crusher, such as a garden shed or a kebab trailer. In one episode, a man was asked to sing one of his favourite songs to stop his garden shed from being crushed. After he had sung the song, the shed was crushed anyway.

After the show opener, there would be a competition to find the "coolest" man in wherever that particular show was being held, such as Wood Green or Port Talbot. There would be three contestants who claimed to be the coolest man in their town; they would then go through a scientific "test" to find the coolest man. The men would be connected to heart monitors and a scary story would be told, during which Freddie would usually perform actions appropriate to the story, such as hitting one of the men over the head with a tray or making noises to simulate thunder and wind, pouring tomato ketchup over someone's head to simulate blood, or pouring ice down the back of someone to stimulate chills. The man with the lowest heart rate would be claimed the coolest man in the area and would receive a cloak and giant medallion.

Then, the 'Babies Win Prizes' contest would follow. The contest featured nine toddlers and one of their parents competing to win a toy car. Three heats would be held to narrow the number of toddlers and parents down to three; the toddlers would have to take part in certain challenges, such as:
 Snooker Loopy: The toddlers would have to throw as many custard pies as possible at their parents' faces. The toddler who threw the most would win the heat.
 Yeehaw: The toddlers would have to ride on their parents' backs and lasso cans off of several fences. The one who knocked off the most would win the heat.
 Joey the Clown: Using make up, the toddlers would have to make their parents look like a picture of a clown. The one who got the closest to the picture would win the heat.

The heats were followed by the 'Clash of the Clans' contest. This consisted of two families competing to win a giant trophy, usually manufactured by a nearby steelworks factory, in a talent contest. The round required the demonstration of various talents, such as dancing, singing, and stand-up comedy. There were three judges with buzzers; if all three buzzers were pressed, the contestant would have to leave the stage. The family who spent the most time on stage would win the trophy. The show would then return to the Babies Win Prizes semi-final.

The three winners of the heats would then compete in a semi-final. One of the semi-final challenges was called "Ready, Steady, Blaghh!". In this challenge the toddlers had to feed their parents freezing cold food (which the commentator joked that he had cooked himself). The two toddlers who fed their parents the most would get through to the final. The losers were given a goody bag and certificate.

Then, the final event, "Beat the Crusher", would begin. All the number plates in the car park outside the studio would be entered into a computer, two number plates would be selected at random, and the couple to whom the car belonged would have to play the game. While the couples prepared, the show returned to Babies Win Prizes for the final.

In the babies' final the two remaining toddlers would have to go through an obstacle course; the one who completed the course in the fastest time would win the toy car, and the runner-up would win a bike.

Then "Beat the Crusher" began. The two couples, now ready for the game, would have to answer multiple-choice general-knowledge questions. If a couple got a question wrong, their car would move up a level on a moving platform and closer to the crusher. If they got the question right, the opposing couple's car would move up a level. If they got a question wrong when they were above the crusher, known as the 'Danger Zone', or the opposing team got a question right, the loser's car was dropped into the crusher and destroyed. The owners received bus fare home as a consolation prize. The winning couple would then have a choice of two new cars, either a luxury estate car or a stylish four-door saloon.

External links

1990s British game shows
1998 British television series debuts
1998 British television series endings
Sky UK original programming
Television series by Banijay
Television series by Tiger Aspect Productions